Norbert Grudzinski (12 May 1977) is a German football referee from Hamburg. Grudzinski lives in Hamburg and is a wholesale and export trader. 

Grudzinski has been a German Football Association referee since 1999. In 2004, he was voted the best referee in Hamburg.

Grudzinski has overseen 85 2. Bundesliga matches as a referee, and another 168 Bundesliga matches as an assistant referee. Grudzinski replaced referee Michael Weiner in the 75th minute of a match in March 2014, marking his debut as a referee in the Bundesliga.

References

1977 births
German football referees
Living people
21st-century German people